Kerrie Roberts (born November 14, 1985) is an American contemporary Christian artist. She has released two albums and one EP under Reunion Records. She has also released a standalone single in 2005. Several songs from her self-titled major label debut have charted on the Billboard Hot Christian Songs chart including the Top Ten hit "No Matter What".

Early life

Kerrie Roberts grew up as a daughter to a pastor and a church choir director. It is because of this that Roberts spent a lot of time in the church during her childhood.  Roberts began performing music at the age of 5, singing in her mom's church choir. According to her YouTube autobiography, she was so small that she had to stand on a milk crate in order for the congregation to see her. This experience eventually led to her playing piano and leading worship music in the church. Roberts' music revolved solely around her parents' church until high school, at which point she began writing her own songs. This writing continued while she attended college at the University of Miami; she graduated with a degree in studio music and jazz vocal.

Music career

In 2001, Roberts appeared in the first U.S. installment of the singing competition show PopStars that aired on The WB. She made it through multiple auditions and boot camps to achieve a spot in the top 10 finalists. Despite being what show runners called one of the “strongest [6] singers”, Roberts removed herself from the competition before final selections, stating she had prayed on it and decided the image of the group among other things were not right for her or what she wanted to do.

After college, Roberts began her music career. Her first release was a standalone single called "It Is Well with Me". The one-track single was released independently in September 2005.

She released her album Kerrie Roberts and it peaked on the Billboards Christian Albums chart at No. 27. Three singles from the album charted on Billboard'''s Hot Christian Songs chart; "No Matter What" hit No. 9, "Outcast" at No. 29, and "Take You Away" at No. 28.

"Rescue Me (How the Story Ends)" was used in promos for the ABC drama Once Upon a Time, which began airing in the U.S on Sunday October 23, 2011. The song debuted in the Australian ARIA Charts at No. 49 in 2012, before dropping from the chart completely.

On April 2, 2013, Roberts released her second full-length recording: Time for the Show.

The next year, on December 16, 2014, she released an EP: My Heart's Lifted.

On March 17, 2017, Roberts released her first full-length recording in four years: Boundless''.

Discography

Studio albums
References:

Studio EPs

Singles
 References:

References

External links
 

Musicians from Miami
American performers of Christian music
Reunion Records artists
1985 births
Living people
21st-century American singers
University of Miami Frost School of Music alumni
21st-century American women singers